William Stewart Wilson (born 19 August 1972) is a Scottish retired footballer who played for Ayr United, Dumbarton, Cowdenbeath, East Fife and Airdrie United.

References

1972 births
Scottish footballers
Dumbarton F.C. players
East Fife F.C. players
Cowdenbeath F.C. players
Ayr United F.C. players
Scottish Football League players
Living people
Airdrieonians F.C. players
Elgin City F.C. players
Bathgate Thistle F.C. players
Footballers from Glasgow
Association football midfielders
Kirkintilloch Rob Roy F.C. players
Scottish Junior Football Association players